The following a list of American football games that United States Armed Forces servicemen played in Europe during World War II. Games are listed in chronological order. Most games took place in the United Kingdom.

See also
List of World War II military service football teams
History of American football

References

World_War_II
Games in Europe during World War II